Burns House may refer to:

in Scotland
Burns Cottage, a home of poet Robert Burns

in the United States
Bob Burns House, Van Buren, Arkansas, listed on the National Register of Historic Places (NRHP) in Crawford County
Irene Burns House, Auburn, California, listed on the NRHP in Placer County
William J. Burns House, Sarasota, Florida, NRHP-listed
Burns Realty Company-Karl Bickel House, Sarasota, Florida, NRHP-listed
Burns Cottage (Atlanta, Georgia), NRHP-listed
Caleb Burns House, Maryville, Missouri, listed on the NRHP in Nodaway County
Burns Family Farm, Bovina, New York, NRHP-listed
Emma Petznick and Otto Schade House, Bowman, North Dakota, also as the Opal Burns Home, listed on the NRHP
Jeremiah Burns Farm, Waynesboro, Pennsylvania, NRHP-listed
Burns House (Yankton, South Dakota), NRHP-listed
Arthur Burns House, Cuero, Texas, listed on the NRHP in DeWitt County
John W. Burns House, Cuero, Texas, listed on the NRHP in DeWitt County